Frank Chiesurin (born November 26 in Montreal, Quebec) is a Canadian film and television actor. He has had roles in a variety of American and Canadian productions, including the films Resident Evil: Apocalypse; 12 Men of Christmas; The Prize Winner of Defiance, Ohio; Lie with Me; Suits and Cake and the television series Big Wolf on Campus; Un gars, une fille; Doc; Largo Winch; Météo+; Les Bleus de Ramville and The Latest Buzz.

Filmography

Film

Television

References

External links
Frank Chiesurin

Living people
Male actors from Montreal
Canadian male film actors
Canadian male television actors
Year of birth missing (living people)